Syed Murad Ali Shah (born 8 November 1962) is a Pakistani politician and structural engineer who is the 29th and current Chief Minister of Sindh province of Pakistan and has been a member of the Sindh Assembly.

Early life and education 
Shah was born in Karachi, Pakistan, to Syed Abdullah Ali Shah who was also chief minister of Sindh. Shah matriculated from Saint Patrick's High School, did intermediate study at D. J. Sindh Government Science College in Karachi, and was admitted to the engineering programme at the NED University of Engineering and Technology. He graduated with a B.E. in civil engineering and was a silver medalist on his graduation from the NED. After earning the Quaid-e-Azam scholarship, he went to the United States and attended Stanford University in California where he completed his M.Sc. in structural engineering. He completed a second master's from Stanford University two years later in economic systems where again he was on an international scholarship.

From 1986 to 1990, Shah pursued his engineering career with the Government of Sindh as a water engineer at the Water and Power Development Authority in Lahore. He later went to join the Port Qasim Authority in Karachi. He was also a city engineer for Hyderabad's Development Authority. He was an engineer at Wapda, Port Qasim Authority and the Hyderabad Development Authority, before joining Citibank. Shah worked for Citibank in Sindh and in London. He also worked at the Gulf Investment Corporation in Kuwait.

Political career 
He became a member of the Provincial Assembly of Sindh in 2002 for the first time representing PS-77 Jamshoro-cum-Dadu (Old Dadu III). He was elected to the Sindh Assembly in 2008 as a member of the Pakistan Peoples Party and was the provincial Minister for Irrigation in Syed Qaim Ali Shah's cabinet. In 2013, he was made the provincial finance minister. In July 2016, Shah was elected to the chief minister's office.

He was minister for irrigation (Sindh) and finance minister of Sindh before his elevation to chief minister of Sindh in 2016. Shah was barred from contesting in 2013 despite giving up his Canadian citizenship. After proving to the courts that he did not hold Canadian nationality, Shah was able to run in the election. He was elected to the Sindh Assembly for a third consecutive time. He was subsequently assigned the finance ministry in the provincial cabinet.

References 

Chief Minister of Sindh

Living people
1962 births
Chief Ministers of Sindh
Pakistan People's Party MPAs (Sindh)
People from Jamshoro District
Pakistani emigrants to Canada
Canadian emigrants to Pakistan
NED University of Engineering & Technology alumni
Pakistani civil engineers
Stanford University alumni
St. Patrick's High School, Karachi alumni
D. J. Sindh Government Science College alumni
Sindhi people
Murad Ali Shah
Sindh MPAs 2008–2013
Sindh MPAs 2013–2018
Murad Ali Shah
People who lost Canadian citizenship
Naturalized citizens of Canada